Jean-Yves Clément (born July 21, 1959 in Bourges) is a French essayist, poet and organizer of festivals.

Biography 
Jean-Yves Clément pursued university advanced studies in philosophy (Nietzsche and art) and has a high level in piano and advanced musicology qualifications.

In 1990, he became collection director at the publishing house , a post he held until 2012. There he created the collection "Amor fati" and published the unedited works of authors including Alain-Fournier, Nietzsche, and Jules Renard.

In 2002, he founded the Lisztomanias of Châteauroux, a music festival where world-renowned artists gather. He is the artistic director, as well as Lisztomanias International, association created in 2012 to export the model and the humanist spirit of Franz Liszt to the world.

In 2011, Jean-Yves Clément was appointed Commissioner General of the "Liszt Year" in France by Frédéric Mitterrand, the then Minister of Culture.

In 2012, Jean-Yves Clément received from the Minister of Culture Frédéric Mitterrand the title of officer in the Ordre des Arts et des Lettres.

In 2018, he is promoted, by the Minister of Culture Françoise Nyssen, commander in the Ordre des Arts et des Lettres.

Works 

 Propos-exutoires, Paris, 1990 
 De l’aube à midi (From Dawn to Noon), Paris, Le Cherche midi, 1999 
 Variations Chopin : Quarante-huit préludes (Chopin Variations: Forty-eight Preludes), Vendœuvres, Lancosme éditeur, 2005 
 111 notes d’amour : Variations (111 Love Notes: Variations), Paris, Le Cherche midi, 2008 
 Nuits de l’âme (Nights of the Soul), Paris, Le Cherche midi, 2009 
 Les Deux Âmes de Frédéric Chopin (The Two Souls of Frederic Chopin), first edition Paris, 2010 ; second edition Paris, Le Passeur éditeur, 2017 
 Franz Liszt : La Dispersion magnifique (Franz Liszt: The Magnificent Dispersion), Arles, Actes Sud, 2011 
 Le Chant de toi : Ode (The Song of You: Ode), Paris, Le Cherche midi, 2012 
 La Raison des sortilèges : Entretiens sur la musique (with Michel Onfray), first edition Paris, 2013 ; second edition Paris, Pluriel, 2015 
 Nietzsche au jour le jour : Un florilège pour tous et pour personne (Friedrich Nietzsche quotations), Paris, Le Passeur éditeur, 2013 
 De l’aube à midi : Aphorismes, Paris, Le Passeur éditeur, 2013 
 Suite lyrique (with the painter Jean-Marc Brunet), Paris, Le Passeur éditeur, 2013 
 Alexandre Scriabine : L'Ivresse des sphères, Arles, Actes Sud, 
 Les pensées : Suivies du Dictionnaire des idées reçues (à partir de l’œuvre de Gustave Flaubert), Paris, Le Cherche midi, 
 Glenn Gould ou le Piano de l’esprit, Arles, Actes Sud, 2016 

 Musical Adaptations of his Work 

 The composer Pierre Thilloy set Jean-Yves Clément's aphorisms to music in his work Mysterium conjunctionis (2005) for seven instruments and a mezzo-soprano.
 Thilloy also wrote a setting of Le Chant de Toi'' (2014) for soprano and piano.

References

External links 
  Site officiel du Nohant Festival official site
  Lisztomanias official site
 Lisztomanias International Official website

1950 births
Living people
Writers from Bourges
20th-century French male writers
21st-century French male writers
French male non-fiction writers
French male poets